Thomas Hirschhofer (born 30 January 1992) is an Austrian footballer who plays as a midfielder for DSV Leoben.

References

1992 births
Living people
Footballers from Graz
Association football forwards
Austrian footballers
Kapfenberger SV players
FC Wacker Innsbruck (2002) players
Floridsdorfer AC players
SK Austria Klagenfurt players
Wiener Sport-Club players
DSV Leoben players
Austrian Football Bundesliga players
2. Liga (Austria) players
Austrian Regionalliga players